Francisco Saavedra de Sangronis (1746–1819) was a Spanish government official and soldier whose work in Cuba during the American Revolutionary War laid the foundations for the defeat of British forces in Florida and at Yorktown.

Early career
Francisco Saavedra was born in Seville, Spain, in 1746, and trained as a doctor. He served alongside Bernardo de Gálvez in Spain's military campaign at Algiers in the 1770s, and through him changed career to work in Spain's Ministry of the Indies, principally as a financial planner. In 1780 he was sent to try to sort out the Spanish administration at Havana in Cuba, with the additional task of working alongside Gálvez once more, to retake Florida from British control. When the ship taking him to the Caribbean was captured by the British, Saavedra passed himself off as a merchant, and was allowed free movement within Jamaica (the British being completely unaware that just two years earlier he had been involved in planning for a future Spanish invasion of the island). He took the opportunity to find out all he could about Jamaica's ports, defences etc. A thoughtful and prescient man, he recorded in his diary in 1780:

What is not being thought about at present, what ought to occupy the whole attention of politics, is the great upheaval that in time the North American revolution is going to produce in the human race.

Saavedra and Yorktown
In January 1781 he was finally released by the British, and began work in Havana. After making initial recommendations for administrative changes, over the next few months he helped to organise, and actually took part in Gálvez' successful siege of Pensacola, the key British base in Florida. On his return he found that his recommendations had been accepted by the Spanish government, and key officials had been replaced. In July, at the request of the Minister (José de Gálvez, Bernardo's uncle), Saavedra, who spoke and wrote French fluently, met in the French colony of St. Domingue with Admiral de Grasse to discuss the best ways of using the large French fleet he had brought across the Atlantic, and they agreed a plan for the following year, known as the Grasse-Saavedra Convention. First priority was to aid the French and American forces in the United States, preferably by attacking the British force in Virginia under Lord Cornwallis. Next was to regain control of Caribbean islands captured by the British. The final goal of the plan was the capture of Jamaica, by far the richest British possession in the West Indies. To finance phase 1, Saavedra obtained 100,000 pesos from the Spanish treasury in neighboring Santo Domingo.  The Spanish had planned to finance the French and North Americans with pesos shipped through Veracruz from the mines in Mexico. The ships had not arrived, and then, finding that most of the Government money from Havana had been sent on to Spain, he appealed to Cuban citizens, who raised a further 500,000 pesos in a matter of hours.

Later career
Over the next few months, while De Grasse went ahead with the plan, Saavedra made detailed preparations for the invasion of Jamaica. The defeat of the French fleet at the Battle of the Saintes in April 1782 was a major setback, but preparations continued. However, by the end of 1782 the Spanish government decided to abandon what looked likely to be a very costly project. From 1783 to 1788, Saavedra served as intendant of Caracas, following which he returned to Spain and became first a member of the Supreme War Council, then in 1797 Finance Minister, and the following year, Minister of State. However, his health was failing, so shortly afterwards he retired to Andalucia, only to come back to service in 1810 when Napoleon's French forces invaded Spain. He died on 25 November 1819.

References 
 Francisco Morales Padrón, Journal of Don Francisco Saavedra de Sangronis, 1780-1783, Gainesville: University of Florida Press, 1988.
 Thomas E. Chávez, Spain and the Independence of the United States: An Intrinsic Gift, Albuquerque: University of New Mexico Press, 2002.
 Stephen Bonsal, When the French Were Here, Garden City, New York: Doubleday, Doran and Company, Inc., 1945.
 Jonathan R. Dull, The French Navy and American Independence, Princeton: Princeton University Press, 1975.
 Granville Hough,  Spanish Heroes of the American Revolution: Francisco Saavedra de Sangronis, via somosprimos.com- accessed 2008-01-03

External links

 Contribution of Spanish and Hispanic Americans to the Battle of Yorktown

Economy and finance ministers of Spain
Prime Ministers of Spain
1746 births
1819 deaths
Spanish people of the American Revolution
Spanish generals